The 12th Pan American Games were held in Mar del Plata, Argentina from March 11 to March 26, 1995.

See also
 Bolivia at the 1996 Summer Olympics

References

Nations at the 1995 Pan American Games
P
1995